Iyayu (Idoani) is an Edoid language of Ondo State, Nigeria. It is sometimes considered the same language as Uhami.

References

Edoid languages